The State of Penang in Malaysia, home to the country's second largest city as well as part of Malaysia's second most populous conurbation, has a relatively well-developed transport infrastructure. The city-state is well-connected by land, air and sea; the Penang International Airport is one of Malaysia's busiest, while the Port of Penang is the main harbour and transshipment hub within northern Malaysia. The North–South Expressway, the main highway along western Peninsular Malaysia, runs through Penang, while the two geographically separate halves of the state are now linked by two bridges and a ferry service.

Within the state, Rapid Penang forms the backbone of urban public transport, with public bus services throughout the Greater Penang Conurbation (including towards the neighbouring states of Kedah and Perak). In addition, Penang boasts the only operational funicular railway system in Malaysia – the Penang Hill Railway.

In recent years, however, traffic congestion has become increasingly frequent around the capital city, George Town, leading to current efforts to improve and introduce newer forms of public transport in the state.

History

Roads 
The first roads in the capital city of Penang, George Town, were created in 1786, soon after its founding by Captain Francis Light. Light Street, named after Light himself, was the first street to be laid out. By the end of the 18th century, the original settlement of George Town was bounded by four streets – Light Street, Beach Street, Chulia Street and Pitt Street.

Public transport 

George Town was the first British settlement in Malaya. Thus, the city served as a testbed for the relatively novel forms of transport during the colonial era, and, by the early 20th century, could boast the best public transport of all cities in Malaya.
One of the earliest modes of transport in Penang was the horse hackney carriage, which was widely used between the late 18th century until 1935. By then, the rickshaw (jinriksha) and later the trishaw, also known locally as beca in Malay, became popular. To this day, the trishaw, an icon synonymous with colonial Penang, is still in use in George Town, albeit mostly for sightseeing rides by tourists.

Other famous modes of urban public transport in colonial Penang were trams and trolleybuses. The first steam tramway commenced operations in the 1880s, making George Town the first city in Malaya to be equipped with trams. Electrical trams were also introduced in 1905. Meanwhile, Penang's first trolleybus was launched in 1925. Trolleybuses soon supplanted the trams and remained popular until the post-war years.

In 1961, George Town's trolleybus system was discontinued. Henceforth, Penang's urban public transport system came to be dominated by regular public buses.

However, the public bus services, which were operated by a number of competing private companies, were deemed unsatisfactory. Following the collapse of Penang's public bus services in 2004, the Malaysian federal government intervened by tasking Prasarana, a government-linked firm, to take over the state's ailing public transport system. As a result, Rapid Penang was launched in 2007.

Seaport 
George Town was intended by the British as an entrepôt, and for much of its history, its harbour facilities along the Penang Strait had contributed to the growth of the Port of Penang as one of the main harbours in British Malaya, aside from the Port of Singapore. By the early 20th century, the Port of Penang had become a major transshipment hub in Malaya, funneling exports which had bypassed other regional ports and channeling for export some of the major Malayan commodities, including spices, rubber and tin.

However, the role of the Port of Penang has greatly diminished since the revocation of Penang Island's free port status in 1969; the concurrent development of Port Klang near Kuala Lumpur further reduced the Port of Penang's trade volume. In 1974, much of the Port of Penang was relocated to Butterworth on mainland Seberang Perai.

Penang is also home to the oldest ferry service in Malaysia. Launched in 1894, it became the first cross-strait transport link between Penang Island and mainland Seberang Perai; for many decades, it was also the only form of cross-strait transport until the opening of the Penang Bridge in 1985. This shuttle ferry service was rebranded as Rapid Ferry in 2017.

Airport 
The Penang International Airport in Bayan Lepas was completed in 1935, becoming the first civilian airport in British Malaya. The first flight into the airport by a local airliner, Wearne's Air Service (WAS), was launched in 1937, linking Penang with its fellow Straits Settlement, Singapore.

Since then, the airport has been renovated twice; originally named the Bayan Lepas International Airport, it was given its present name in the 1970s.

Land transport

Rail 

The Malayan Railway's West Coast Line runs through Seberang Perai, with the Butterworth railway station serving as the main railway station in northern Malaysia, due to its transport links to Penang Island. The other major train stations within Seberang Perai include Bukit Mertajam and Nibong Tebal.

Aside from the regular Malayan Railway services along the western states of Peninsular Malaysia and into Singapore, the Butterworth railway station is the southernmost terminus of the State Railway of Thailand's Southern Line (via Padang Besar) and the International Express from Bangkok. Notably, the train station is also one of the main stops of the Eastern and Oriental Express service between Bangkok and Singapore.

Trains are not a popular mode of transport due to their low speed and the availability of express interstate buses which are more convenient, as well as the high rates of car ownership amongst Penangites.

Bridges

Penang Island is connected to the mainland via two cross-strait bridges - the Penang Bridge and the Second Penang Bridge. Completed in 2014, it supersedes the older first bridge as the longest bridge in Southeast Asia.

Roads and expressways 
The North–South Expressway, a  expressway through western Peninsular Malaysia, runs through Seberang Perai. After exiting either one of both bridges, commuters can directly use the expressway to get to the other major cities and towns along western Peninsular Malaysia.

The Butterworth Outer Ring Road (BORR) is a  tolled expressway that primarily serves Butterworth, Perai and Seberang Jaya to ameliorate the upsurge in vehicular traffic due to the intense urban and industrial development.

On Penang Island, the Tun Dr Lim Chong Eu Expressway stretches along the eastern coast of the island between George Town and Batu Maung to the south, passing through the Bayan Lepas Free Industrial Zone and the suburbs of Jelutong and Gelugor. A bypass also links the expressway with the Penang Bridge. Other than that, the Federal Route 6 is a winding trunk road that circles Penang Island, hugging the island's coastline to connect, in clockwise direction, George Town, Bayan Lepas, Balik Pulau and Teluk Bahang.

The Penang Middle Ring Road, which is composed of Scotland Road, Green Lane and Jalan Tengku Kudin, is an important ring road within George Town, allowing vehicular traffic to bypass the busier roads within the city centre.

Public transport

Transit buses 

Public transit buses, now solely run by Rapid Penang, remain the main mode of urban public transport system within Penang. , Rapid Penang operates a fleet of 406 buses and 56 routes throughout the Greater Penang Conurbation, including routes into neighbouring Kedah and Perak. 30 of the 56 routes are within Penang Island, with a handful of these pan-island routes equipped with double-decker buses as well. Also among the routes are free-of-charge services, such as the Central Area Transit, the Congestion Alleviation Transport and the Pulau Tikus Loop.

Recently, open-air double-decker buses, known as Hop-On Hop-Off buses, have been introduced for tourists in George Town.

Rapid Penang usage has seen an increase from a lowly 30,000 commuters a day in 2007 to 96,000 commuters a day in 2017. Annually, Rapid Penang ridership has fluctuated somewhat, reaching a peak of 31.1 million in 2011.

Penang Hill funicular 

The Penang Hill Railway, a funicular railway to the peak of Penang Hill, is the only such system still in operation in Malaysia. Completed in 1923, it was considered an engineering feat of sorts at the time. The railway underwent an extensive upgrading in 2010 and was reopened in early 2011. It now serves visitors travelling up the Penang Hill, providing quick and direct access to the hill's peak.

, the number of passengers of the funicular railway reached 1.365 million.

Express interstate buses 

Penang has two main interstate express bus terminals - Penang Sentral in Butterworth and the Sungai Nibong terminal on Penang Island. These two terminals handle interstate express bus operations into and out of Penang, catering to local and foreign passengers heading towards other states within Peninsular Malaysia, and into Singapore and southern Thailand.

Cycling 

In recent years, the Penang state government, in collaboration with the Penang Island City Council, has stepped up initiatives to make George Town a cyclist-friendly city. These efforts, which are part of the wider efforts to reduce traffic congestion and elevate the city's liveability standards, include the creation of cycling paths and the implementation of bicycle rental services.

The Penang Island City Council has also funded a bicycle-rental service, LinkBike, which was launched in 2016. This service requires the use of smartphones to rent a bicycle at any of the 25 electronically-operated stations within George Town.

In addition to LinkBike, a number of private companies have also offered bicycle rental services for use within George Town's UNESCO World Heritage Site.

Taxis and private ride hailing services 
In 2015, Uber launched services in Penang, one of the first metropolitan areas in Malaysia to allow such a service. A similar service, Grab, followed suit in 2016. These ride-hailing services have provided cheaper and safer alternatives for Penangites and tourists alike. In 2017, Uber revealed that Penang was its fastest growing market in Malaysia, with "thousands of drivers" and over 100,000 users within the state. Of the local users, 28% commuted to work daily with Uber and 20 percent utilised the application for weekend trips within Penang.

Air transport
The airport serves as the main gateway to the northern region of Peninsular Malaysia, offering frequent, direct flights with several major Asian cities including Kuala Lumpur, Singapore, Bangkok, Jakarta, Ho Chi Minh City, Hong Kong, Guangzhou, Kunming and Taipei.

In 2015, 6.26 million visitors transited through Penang International Airport, making it the third busiest airport in the country in terms of passenger traffic, behind only Kuala Lumpur International Airport and Kota Kinabalu International Airport.

Some of the international carriers operating at Penang International Airport include Singapore-based Tiger Airways, Jetstar Asia Airways, Lion Air, Sriwijaya Air, Wings Air, Thai Airways International, Taiwan-based China Airlines, and China Southern Airlines and Citilink Indonesia. In addition, the airport serves as one of the main hubs of the Malaysian low-cost airline, Firefly, and one of the secondary hubs of its domestic rival, AirAsia.

The airport also serves as an important cargo hub due to the presence of several multinational factories in the Bayan Lepas Free Trade Zone, as well as catering to the northern region of Peninsular Malaysia. , it handled 153,703 tonnes of cargo, the second largest cargo tonnage of all Malaysian airports.

Sea transport 
The Port of Penang, operated by the Penang Port Commission, is the main harbour and transshipment hub in northern Malaysia. The Port comprises seven facilities, with six of them on mainland Seberang Perai, including the North Butterworth Container Terminal, Butterworth Deep Water Wharves and the Prai Bulk Cargo Terminal.

Even though Penang's maritime trade volume has diminished over the recent decades due to the loss of George Town's free port status and the development of Port Klang, the Port still plays an important role for northern Malaysia, as it links Penang with more than 200 ports worldwide. , the Port of Penang handled over 1.44 million TEUs of cargo, making it the third busiest seaport in Malaysia by trade volume. The Port's strategic location enabled it to service not just northern Peninsular Malaysia, but also southern Thailand.

The Port of Penang is well-connected via rail and expressways. It is linked via the Malayan Railway's West Coast Line and the North–South Expressway to the rest of Peninsular Malaysia, Singapore and southern Thailand. In addition, it is located close to the Penang Bridge and the Second Penang Bridge, allowing for the transport of goods to and from the factories in Bayan Lepas.

Meanwhile, the only Port facility on Penang Island, Swettenham Pier in George Town, now accommodates cruise ships, making it one of the main entry points into the state. This makes cruise tourism a major component of tourist arrivals into Penang, other than airport arrivals. , Swettenham Pier recorded 1.35 million tourist arrivals, thereby surpassing Port Klang as the busiest port-of-call in Malaysia for cruise shipping. A handful of cruise ships call Swettenham Pier as their homeport, bringing tourists into and out of George Town towards regional destinations like Phuket and Singapore.

Occasionally, Swettenham Pier hosts warships as well, including those from Singapore, Thailand and the United States.

The cross-strait Penang Ferry Service provides a direct connection between George Town and Butterworth, and was the only link between Penang Island and the mainland until the completion of the Penang Bridge in 1985. At the time of writing, six ferries sail across the Penang Strait between George Town and Butterworth daily.

Ongoing efforts and future proposals

Penang Sentral 

, the construction of Penang Sentral, a major transport hub in Butterworth along the lines of KL Sentral, is ongoing. Located adjacent to both the Butterworth railway station and Sultan Abdul Halim Ferry Terminal, it is intended to house the termini for ferry, bus (both public transit and interstate express buses) and train services within Penang under one roof, and was mooted as Penang's answer to the monolithic Kuala Lumpur Sentral. The first phase of the project, which includes the ticketing facilities for the various transport services, is scheduled for completion in 2017.

Penang Transport Master Plan 
The Penang state government has drawn up plans to bring in more rail-based transport systems throughout Penang. The Penang Transport Master Plan envisages the following long-term solutions to counter the state's worsening traffic congestion, which is compounded by Penang's abnormally high vehicle ownership rate and the state's limited space for urban development.
 A Light Rail Transit line between George Town and Bayan Lepas
 Two monorail lines that connect George Town with Air Itam, Paya Terubong and Tanjung Tokong
 A tram line limited to within George Town's UNESCO World Heritage Site
 Cross-strait cable car line linking Komtar in George Town and Penang Sentral in Butterworth
Currently, the Light Rapid Transit line between George Town and the Penang International Airport, also known as the Bayan Lepas LRT line, is being allocated the top priority by the Penang state government. In April 2019, the LRT project was received conditional approval from the federal government. Construction is expected to start in June 2020.

On 1 July 2020 it was announced that Gamuda Bhd would be the project delivery partner (PDP) for the Penang Transport Master Plan (PTMP).

References